Legislative Assembly elections were held in March 1972, to elect members to the Bihar Legislative Assembly. After the elections, the Congress emerged as the largest party, and Kedar Pandey was sworn in as the Chief Minister of Bihar. Later, Abdul Gafoor become the Chief Minister, from 2 July 1973 to 11 April 1975, followed by Jagannath Mishra from 11 April 1975 to 30 April 1977.

Party-wise performance

Elected members

References

1972
1972
Bihar